WKOM (101.7 FM) is a radio station broadcasting a news/talk/classic hits format. Licensed to Columbia, Tennessee, United States, the station is currently owned by Middle Tennessee Broadcasting Company and features programming from Premiere Radio Networks and Motor Racing Network.

References

External links

Oldies radio stations in the United States
KOM
Columbia, Tennessee